Hatikva (lit. The Hope) was a minor political party in Israel. A secular far-right party, it was headed by Aryeh Eldad, and formed one of the factions of the National Union alliance.

Formed in late 2007, it was officially registered on 9 December 2007. Eldad stated that the party needs 5000 members "to be legally qualified to raise up to NIS 2 million for each candidate running for party chairman".

For the 2009 elections, the party joined the National Union, with Eldad winning fourth place on the Union's list.

In 2012, Hatikva and the Jewish National Front, another member party of the National Union, announced their decision to leave the alliance and form Otzma LeYisrael.

References

Defunct political parties in Israel
Political parties established in 2007
2007 establishments in Israel
Conservative parties in Israel
Far-right political parties in Israel
Revisionist Zionism
Zionist political parties in Israel
Political parties disestablished in 2012
2012 disestablishments in Israel